Spitfire Mk.I may refer to:

 Supermarine Spitfire Mk.I
 Spitfire Helicopters Spitfire Mk.I